Park Tae-won may refer to:

Park Taewon (1909–1986), Korean writer
Park Tae-won (footballer) (born 1977), South Korean footballer